Cathedral of Saint Nicholas is a Ukrainian Orthodox church located in the Tsentralnyi borough, Mariupol, Ukraine.

General Information 
The cathedral is a six-domed church, built between 1989 and 1991 and designed by the architects AD Kljujew & NJ Erenburg (Russian: А. Д. Клюєв & Н. Ю. Еренбург). The artist Sergej Alekseevich Barannik decorated the church.

In 2022, during the Siege of Mariupol, the cathedral was heavily damaged.

Gallery

See also 
 List of cathedrals in Ukraine

References

External Links 

 In pictures: The Ukrainian religious sites ruined by fighting

Cathedrals in Ukraine
Culture in Mariupol
Buildings and structures in Mariupol
Ukrainian Orthodox Church (Moscow Patriarchate) cathedrals
Buildings and structures destroyed during the 2022 Russian invasion of Ukraine